Yogyakarta is the capital city of Special Region of Yogyakarta in Indonesia, in the south-central part of the island of Java. As the only Indonesian royal city still ruled by a monarchy, Yogyakarta is regarded as an important centre for classical Javanese fine arts and culture such as ballet, batik textiles, drama, literature, music, poetry, silversmithing, visual arts, and wayang puppetry. Renowned as a centre of Indonesian education, Yogyakarta is home to a large student population and dozens of schools and universities, including Gadjah Mada University, the country's largest institute of higher education and one of its most prestigious.

Yogyakarta is the capital of the Yogyakarta Sultanate and served as the Indonesian capital from 1946 to 1948 during the Indonesian National Revolution, with Gedung Agung as the president's office. One of the districts in southeastern Yogyakarta, Kotagede, was the capital of the Mataram Sultanate between 1587 and 1613.

The city's population was 388,627 at the 2010 Census, and 373,589 at the 2020 Census. Its metropolitan area was home to 4,010,436 inhabitants in 2010, which includes the city of Magelang and 65 districts across Sleman, Klaten, Bantul, Kulon Progo and Magelang Regency. Yogyakarta has one of the highest HDI (Human Development Index) in Indonesia.

Etymology and orthography
Yogyakarta is named after the Indian city of Ayodhya, the birthplace of the eponymous hero Rama from the Ramayana epic. Yogya means "suitable; fit; proper", and karta means "prosperous; flourishing". Thus, Yogyakarta means "[a city that is] fit to prosper".

In the orthography of the time, the proper name was spelt with the Latin alphabet as "Jogjakarta". Personal and geographical names however, were allowed to maintain their original spelling according to contemporary Indonesian orthography. Thus, the city can be written as "Yogyakarta", which is true to its original pronunciation and the Javanese script spelling, or "Jogjakarta", which is true to the old Dutch spelling and reflects popular pronunciation today, but differs from the original Ayodhya etymology. One may encounter either "Yogyakarta" or "Jogjakarta" in contemporary documents.

History

Mataram Kingdom (8th–10th century CE)
According to the Canggal inscription dated 732 CE, the area traditionally known as "Mataram" became the capital of the Medang Kingdom, identified as Mdang i Bhumi Mataram established by King Sanjaya of Mataram. The inscription was found in a Hindu temple in Central Java, 40 km away from Yogyakarta and 20 km away from the giant Borobudur temple complex. This Hindu temple itself was on the border between the area of the Hindu Sañjaya dynasty and the area of the Buddhist Shailendra dynasty. 

Mataram became the centre of a refined and sophisticated Javanese Hindu-Buddhist culture for about three centuries in the heartland of the Progo River valley, on the southern slopes of Mount Merapi volcano. This time period witnessed the construction of numerous candi, including Borobudur and Prambanan.

Around the year 929 CE, the last ruler of the Sañjaya dynasty, King Mpu Sindok of Mataram, moved the seat of power of the Mataram Kingdom from Central Java to East Java and thus established the Isyana dynasty. The exact cause of the move is still uncertain; however, a severe eruption from Mount Merapi or a power struggle with the Sumatra-based Srivijaya kingdom probably caused the move. 

Historians suggest that some time during the reign of King Wawa of Mataram (924–929 CE), Merapi erupted and devastated the kingdom's capital in Mataram.

Majapahit Empire (1293–1527)
During the Majapahit era, the area surrounding modern Yogyakarta was identified again as "Mataram" and recognised as one of the twelve Majapahit provinces in Java ruled by a Duke known as Bhre Mataram. During the reign of the fourth king of the Majapahit Empire, the Hindu King Hayam Wuruk (1350–1389) of the Rajasa dynasty, the title of Bhre Mataram was held by the king's nephew and son-in-law Wikramawardhana, later the fifth king of Majapahit.

Mataram Sultanate (1587–1755)

Kotagede, now a district in southeastern Yogyakarta, was established as the capital of the Mataram Sultanate from 1587 to 1613. 

During the reign of Sultan Agung Hanyokrokusumo (1613–1645), the Mataram Sultanate reached its zenith as the greatest kingdom in Java, and expanded its influence to Central Java, East Java, and half of West Java. After two changes of capital—to Karta and then to Plered, both located in present-day Bantul Regency—the capital of the Mataram Sultanate finally moved to Kartasura.

Yogyakarta secedes and European invasions (1745–1830)

A civil war in the Mataram Sultanate broke out between Pakubuwono II (1745–1749), the last ruler of Kartasura, and his younger brother and heir apparent to the throne, Prince Mangkubumi (later known as Hamengkubuwono I, the first Sultan of Yogyakarta, and the founder of the current ruling royal house). Pakubuwono II had agreed to cooperate with the Dutch East India Company, and ceded some Mataram territory to the Dutch. His younger brother, Prince Mangkubumi, stood against the agreement, citing concerns that the people would become slaves under Dutch rule. During the war, Prince Mangkubumi defeated Pakubuwono II's forces and declared sovereignty in the Sultanate of Yogyakarta, occupying the southern parts of the former Mataram Sultanate.

With Pakubowono II dead from illness, the Yogyakarta Sultanate was established as a result of the Treaty of Giyanti (Perjanjian Gianti), signed and ratified on 13 February 1755 among Prince Mangkubumi, the Dutch East India Company, and his nephew Pakubuwono III and his allies. Ascending to the newly created Yogyakarta throne with the name Sultan Hamengkubuwono I, Mangkubumi thus established the royal House of Hamengkubuwono, still the ruling house of Yogyakarta today. Sultan Hamengkubuwono I and his family officially moved into the Palace of Yogyakarta, still the seat of the reigning sultan, on 7 October 1756. These events consequently marked the end of the Mataram Sultanate, resulting in the births of the rival Yogyakarta Sultanate and the Surakarta Sunanate.

During the brief period British rule over Java in 1811, rumours of plans by the Yogyakarta court to launch an attack against the British led to uneasiness among the Britons stationed in Java. On 20 June 1812, Sir Stamford Raffles led a 1,200-strong British force to capture the Yogyakarta kraton. The Yogyakarta forces, surprised by the attack, were easily defeated; the kraton fell in one day, and was subsequently sacked and burnt. 

The attack on the kraton was the first of its kind in Indonesian history, leaving the Yogyakarta court humiliated. The sultanate found itself involved in conflict again during the Java War.

Republic of Indonesia era (1945–present)
In 1942, the Japanese Empire invaded the Dutch East Indies and ruled Java until they were defeated in 1945. Sukarno proclaimed the independence of the Indonesian Republic on 17 August 1945; Sultan Hamengkubuwono IX promptly sent a letter to Sukarno, expressing his support for the newly born nation of Indonesia and acknowledging the Yogyakarta Sultanate as part of the Indonesian Republic. 

The Sultanate of Surakarta did the same, and both of the Javanese kingdoms were accordingly awarded privileged statuses as "Special Regions" within the Indonesian Republic. However, because of a leftist anti-royalist uprising in Surakarta, the Sunanate of Surakarta lost its special administrative status in 1946 and was absorbed into Central Java Province.

Yogyakarta's support was essential in the Indonesian struggle for independence during the Indonesian National Revolution (1945–1949). The city of Yogyakarta became the capital of the Indonesian Republic from 1946 to 1948, after the fall of Jakarta to the Dutch. Later the Dutch also invaded Yogyakarta, causing the Republic's capital to be transferred once again, to Bukittinggi in West Sumatra on 19 December 1948. The General Offensive of 1 March 1949 resulted in an Indonesian political and strategic victory against the Dutch and the withdrawal of Dutch forces from Yogyakarta. On 29 June 1949 Yogyakarta was completely cleared of Dutch forces, under pressure from the United Nations.

For its significant contribution to the survival of the Indonesian Republic, Yogyakarta was given autonomy as a "special district", making it the only region headed by a recognised monarchy in Indonesia.

Geography

While the city spreads in all directions from the Kraton, the Sultan's palace, the core of the modern city is to the north, centred around Dutch colonial-era buildings and the commercial district. Jalan Malioboro, with rows of pavement vendors and nearby markets and malls, is the primary shopping street for tourists in the city, while Jalan Solo, further north and east, is the shopping district more frequented by locals. The large local market of Beringharjo (id) and the restored Dutch fort of Vredeburg are on the eastern part of the southern end of Malioboro.

Surrounding the Kraton is a densely populated residential neighbourhood that occupies land that was formerly the Sultan's sole domain. Evidence of this former use remains in the form of old walls, scattered throughout the city, and the ruins of the Taman Sari water castle, built in 1758 as a pleasure garden. No longer in use by the Sultan, the garden was largely abandoned before being used for housing by palace employees and descendants. Reconstruction efforts began in 2004, and the site is now a popular tourist attraction.

Nearby to the city of Yogyakarta is Mount Merapi, with the northern outskirts of the city running up to the southern slopes of the mountain in Sleman Regency. Mount Merapi (literally "mountain of fire" in both Indonesian and Javanese), is an active stratovolcano located on the border between Central Java and Yogyakarta. It is the most active volcano in Indonesia and has erupted regularly since 1548, with the last eruption occurring in May 2018.

Climate
Yogyakarta features a tropical monsoon climate (Am) as the precipitation in the driest months between June and September are below . The wettest month in Yogyakarta is January with precipitation totalling . The climate is influenced by the monsoon. The annual temperature is roughly about 26 to 27 Celsius. The hottest month is April with average temperature 27.1 Celsius.

Administrative districts

The city of Yogyakarta is an administrative part of the Yogyakarta Special Region which has the status of a province in Indonesia. In 2020, Yogyakarta city held the highest population density in Greater Yogyakarta, with 11,495 people per square kilometre, Sleman and Bantul regencies holding the second place with a population density of 1,958.5 people/sq kilometre, and third place with 1,940 people/sq kilometre respectively. Within the Greater Yogyakarta area lies Yogyakarta city.

Yogyakarta is divided into fourteen district-level subdivisions called kemantren, which makes Yogyakarta the only city in Indonesia to have such a designation, as it applied only within the Special Region of Yogyakarta. Below is a list of the kemantrens with their areas and their populations as at the 2010 Census and the 2020 Census.

Economy
In 2017, the Gross Domestic Regional Product (GRDP) of Yogyakarta City at current prices was 31.31 trillion rupiahs (around US$ 2.2 billion). The tertiary sector contributed an important share (around 78% of GDP). the tertiary sector included wholesale and retail trade; repair of cars and motorcycles, transportation and warehousing; provision of accommodation and eating and drinking; information and communication; financial services and insurance; real estate; corporate services; government administration, defence and compulsory social security; educational services; health services and social activities as well as other services. In 2017, economic growth of Yogyakarta City reached 5.24 percent slightly faster compared to 2016, which the growth reached 5.11 percent.

To rapidly jumpstart the economy, a plan for the 2nd phase of Indonesian high speed train is currently being developed from Bandung to Yogyakarta & Solo, initiating construction by 2020, which is projected to be completed by 2024.

Demographics
A large majority of the population are Javanese. However, as a city with large numbers of schools and universities and relatively low cost of living compared to other Indonesian cities, Yogyakarta has attracted significant numbers of students from all over Indonesia. As a result, there are many other Indonesian ethnic groups living in Yogyakarta, especially from eastern parts of Indonesia.

There are some foreigner communities in the city, which is mainly composed of tourist and foreign students.

Religion
In 2014, the religious composition in Yogyakarta was distributed over Islam (82.32%), Catholicism (10,66%), Protestantism (6.54%), Buddhism (0.34%), Hinduism (0.13%), and Confucianism (0.01%). 

Yogyakarta has been traditionally known as a region where different faiths live in harmony, but in recent years religious intolerance has grown. 

In 2018, the governor of the Special Region of Yogyakarta, Hamengkubuwono X, called for religious freedoms to be preserved after a terrorist attack against churches and public buildings happened in Yogyakarta the same year.

Tourism

Yogyakarta is home to a myriad of heritage buildings, landmarks and important monuments. Because of its proximity to the Borobudur and Prambanan temples, and presence of the Javanese court Kraton culture of Kraton Yogyakarta, Yogyakarta hosts a sizeable tourist industry. Kotagede, the capital of Mataram Sultanate is also located in the city.

Malioboro street is a popular shopping and culinary area within the city, which has pedestrian zone. Yogyakarta Kraton is the palace and seat of the reigning Sultan of Yogyakarta also located in the city. The palace complex is a centre of Javanese culture, and contains a museum displaying royal artefacts. Tugu monument is an important landmark of Yogyakarta. 1 March monument located on Jalan Malioboro was built to commemorate General Offensive of 1 March 1949 during the Indonesian National Revolution.

Society and traditions

Notable local traditions and marketplaces in Yogyakarta include:

Batik fabric production area, with the most famous batik marketplace in Beringharjo market.
Silverwork, fine filigree jewellery, with the main production centre in Kotagede.
Indonesian mask production, at Bobung village, Wonosari.
Traditional Javanese dance performances, especially Ramayana wayang wong performed in Prambanan and Purowisata. Other Javanese court dances are also performed in the Kraton Ngayogyakarta Hadiningrat (royal palace). 
Wayang kulit, traditional Javanese leather puppetry used for shadow plays.
Contemporary puppetry and theatre, e.g., the Papermoon Puppet Theatre.
Gamelan music, including local Gamelan Yogyakarta which was developed in the royal courts.
Annual traditional Javanese festivals, such as Sekaten or Gerebeg Mulud (:id:Grebeg)
Young theatre movements, e.g., Komunitas Sakatoya.
Visual artists, e.g., the Taring Padi community in Bantul.

Cuisine
 Gudeg Yogya: a traditional food from Yogyakarta and Central Java made from young unripe  (jack fruit) boiled for several hours with palm sugar and coconut milk. Gudeg from Yogyakarta has a unique sweet and savoury taste, and is drier and more reddish than other regional variants because of the addition of Javanese teak leaf.
 : chicken stewed in coriander, garlic, candlenut, and coconut water, then deep-fried until crispy.
 : rice with small side dishes.
 Bakpia and : a sweet pastry filled with sugared mung bean paste, derived from the Chinese pastry. A well-known bakpia-producing area is Pathok near Jalan Malioboro, where  is sold.
 Kipo: derived from the Javanese question  ("What is this?"), a small sweet snack from Kotagede made of glutinous rice flour and coconut milk dough filled with grated coconut and palm sugar.
 Ronde: a hot Javanese dessert of glutinous rice balls stuffed with peanut paste, floating in a hot and sweet ginger and lemongrass tea.
 : a hot soupy dessert of sago pearls, pre-cooked glutinous rice and mung beans,  (brightly coloured, noodle-shaped flour cakes), and fried peanuts, covered in hot and sweet coconut milk.
 Wedhang uwuh (id): a hot Javanese clove drink.

Museums

Yogyakarta has several historical sites, such as the Candi Prambanan temple, museums in the royal court, the Sonobudoyo Museum, and museums in colonial buildings such as the Fort Vredeburg Museum housed in a former Dutch fort. Due to the importance of Yogyakarta during the war of independence from the Dutch, there are numerous memorials and museums, such as the Monument to the Recapture of Yogyakarta.

To the east of the town centre is the large Air Force Museum (Museum Pusat Dirgantara Mandala), with 36 aircraft in the building and six aircraft displayed outdoors. As Indonesia was for a period in the Soviet sphere of influence, this museum contains a number of vintage Russian aircraft not widely available for inspection in the NATO sphere of influence. The collection includes examples of the Mikoyan-Gurevich MiG-15 trainer, Mikoyan-Gurevich MiG-17, Mikoyan-Gurevich MiG-19, Mikoyan-Gurevich MiG-21 and Tupolev Tu-16, together with an assortment of Japanese, American and British aircraft. Other museums include the Jogja National Museum.

Sport 

PSIM Yogyakarta football team, which currently plays in the Liga 2, is based in Yogyakarta.

Education

Yogyakarta is home to Gadjah Mada University, Indonesia's largest university and one of its most prominent. Other public universities in Yogyakarta include Yogyakarta State University, Sunan Kalijaga Islamic University, The Indonesian Institute of the Arts and Poltekkes Kemenkes Yogyakarta. The city is also the location of several well-known private universities such as Muhammadiyah University of Yogyakarta, College of Health Sciences Ahmad Yani Yogyakarta, Islamic University of Indonesia, Atma Jaya University, Duta Wacana Christian University and Sanata Dharma University.

The city is also home to the Indonesian Air Force Academy, located on the Adisucipto Airport complex.

Primagama, one of the largest tutoring institutions in Indonesia, is headquartered in the city.

Transportation

Airport
Yogyakarta is served primarily by Yogyakarta International Airport in Kulon Progo Regency, which connects the city with other major cities in Indonesia, such as Jakarta, Surabaya, Denpasar, Lombok, Makassar, Balikpapan, Banjarmasin, Pekanbaru, Palembang, and Pontianak. It also internationally connects the city with Kuala Lumpur (operated by AirAsia and Indonesia AirAsia). Another airport is Adisutjipto International Airport in Sleman Regency, which only serves limited commercial planes.

Rail

Yogyakarta was first served by rail in 1872. The city is located on one of the two major railway lines that run across Java between Jakarta in the west and Surabaya in the east.

Yogyakarta has two passenger railway stations, Yogyakarta Station which serves business and executive class trains, and Lempuyangan Station which serves economy class trains; both stations are located in the centre of the city. Yogyakarta Station is the terminus of two commuter train services: KRL Commuterline Yogyakarta–Solo, which runs to Solo Balapan Station in the city of Surakarta and Prambanan Express (Prameks), which runs to Kutoarjo Station in Kutoarjo. Other commuter trains run from Madiun Jaya (Madiun Station-Lempuyangan Station), and Joglosemar (Semarang Poncol Station-Lempuyangan Station). Yogyakarta International Airport Rail Link links Yogyakarta International Airport to the city center.

Roads
The city has an extensive system of public city buses, and is a major departure point for inter-city buses to other cities in Java and Bali, as well as taxis, andongs, and becaks. Motorbikes are by far the most commonly used personal transportation, but an increasing number of residents own automobiles. Yogyakarta and surrounding areas also have a circle highway known as the Ring Road and overpasses including Janti Overpass, Lempuyangan Overpass, and a recently built Jombor Overpass.

Buses

Since early 2008, the city has operated a bus rapid transit system, Trans Jogja, also known as "TJ". Trans Jogja is modelled after the TransJakarta system in the capital, but unlike TransJakarta, there is no special lane for Trans Jogja buses, which instead run on main streets. There are currently six Trans Jogja lines, with routes through the main streets of Yogyakarta, some of which overlap. The lines extend from the Jombor Bus Terminal in the north to the Giwangan Bus Terminal in the south, and to the Prambanan bus shelter in the east via Adisucipto International Airport.

Health facilities

Notable hospitals in Yogyakarta include:
 Yogyakarta City General Public Hospital (RSUD Kota Yogyakarta)
 Bethesda Hospital
 Dr. Soetarto Army Hospital
 Dr. Sardjito General Hospital
 Panti Rapih Hospital
 PKU Muhammadiyah Hospital.

Media
Kedaulatan Rakyat (KR) is the major newspaper in Yogyakarta, its headquarters is located near the Tugu monument. First published in 1945, the paper is one of the oldest continuously published newspaper in Indonesia. Other major daily newspapers include Harian Jogja, Koran Merapi and Tribun Jogja, as well as online-only Bernas. KR-owned Minggu Pagi is the major weekly newspaper.

Yogyakarta is served by radio and television stations covering Special Region of Yogyakarta and surrounding areas. The public radio RRI Yogyakarta has one of its studios in the city. Other radio stations based in Yogyakarta include Geronimo FM, Retjo Buntung FM and Yasika FM. However most of television stations is located in nearby Sleman Regency, such as the public TVRI Yogyakarta, AdiTV, Jogja TV and RBTV, though their broadcast coverage include Yogyakarta city.

Twin towns – sister cities

Yogyakarta is twinned with:
 Baalbek, Lebanon
 Commewijne, Suriname
 Gangbuk (Seoul), South Korea
 Huế, Vietnam
 Le Mont-Dore, New Caledonia
 Paramaribo, Suriname

See also

 List of cities in Indonesia

References

External links

 
Cities in Indonesia
Populated places in the Special Region of Yogyakarta
Provincial capitals in Indonesia
Former national capitals